Steve Kim (born 1972) is a United States magistrate judge for the United States District Court for the Central District of California who is a former nominee to be a United States district judge of the same court.

Education 

Judge Kim earned his Bachelor of Arts, with special distinction, from the University of Oklahoma in 1996 and his Juris Doctor, magna cum laude, from Georgetown University Law Center in 1999, where he was inducted into the Order of the Coif and served as Notes & Comments Editor of The Georgetown Law Journal.

Legal career 

Upon graduation from law school, Kim served as a law clerk to Judge Sidney Thomas of the United States Court of Appeals for the Ninth Circuit and Judge Stephen Victor Wilson of the United States District Court for the Central District of California. Before his work as a federal prosecutor, Kim practiced civil trial and appellate litigation at Munger, Tolles & Olson in Los Angeles.  Beginning in 2003, he served as an Assistant United States Attorney in the Criminal Division of the United States Attorney's Office for the Central District of California.  Before taking the bench, Kim was the Managing Director for Stroz Friedberg, LLC, where he advised clients in cybersecurity compliance, data privacy, and law and technology issues.

Federal judicial service

United States magistrate judge 

He assumed office as a United States magistrate judge in 2016.

Expired nomination to district court 

On September 20, 2019, President Trump announced his intent to nominate Kim to serve as a United States district judge for the United States District Court for the Central District of California. On November 21, 2019, his nomination was sent to the Senate. President Trump nominated Kim to the seat vacated by Judge Beverly Reid O'Connell, who died on October 8, 2017. On January 3, 2020, his nomination was returned to the President under Rule XXXI, Paragraph 6 of the United States Senate. On February 13, 2020, his renomination was sent to the Senate. On January 3, 2021, his nomination was returned to the President under Rule XXXI, Paragraph 6 of the United States Senate.

See also
List of Asian American jurists

References

External links 

1972 births
Living people
20th-century American lawyers
21st-century American judges
21st-century American lawyers
Date of birth missing (living people)
Place of birth missing (living people)
American jurists of Asian descent
Assistant United States Attorneys
California lawyers
Georgetown University Law Center alumni
People from Seoul
United States magistrate judges
University of Oklahoma alumni
People associated with Munger, Tolles & Olson